The fourth and final season of Wizards of Waverly Place aired on Disney Channel from November 12, 2010 to January 6, 2012. The Russo children, Alex (Selena Gomez), Justin (David Henrie), and Max Russo (Jake T. Austin) continue to compete to become the leading wizard in their magical family and begin to make difficult decisions about their futures. Maria Canals Barrera and David DeLuise co-star as their parents and Jennifer Stone co-stars as Alex's best friend, Harper Finkle. This is the second season of the series to be broadcast in high-definition.

Opening sequence
The fourth season of the series features a revamped opening sequence with clips from previous seasons. The opening sequence takes place in the wizard lair at the Russo home. Footage of Alex (Selena Gomez) and Justin Russo (David Henrie) is shown in the Crystal replay ball from the season premiere "Alex Tells the World". Then, a spell book opens and footage of Max Russo (Jake T. Austin) and Harper Finkle (Jennifer Stone) appear. After that, footage of Theresa (Maria Canals Barrera) and Jerry Russo (David DeLuise) are shown in a cauldron. After the footage is played, Alex transports them to Times Square, with Alex waving her wand to reveal the title logo and the name of the series' creator. A new version of the theme song "Everything Is Not What It Seems" was produced for this season.

Synopsis
Alex and Justin are sent back to level one in the wizard competition after "exposing" wizardry in "Alex Tells the World", leaving Max as the most expected to become the family wizard. In "Alex Gives Up", Alex quits the competition, but eventually decides to stay in the competition in "Journey to the Center of Mason" to be with Mason. Before then, Harper tries to get Alex to enjoy life without wizardry. Meanwhile, Justin tries to tutor a class of delinquent wizards.

In the episode "Three Maxes and a Little Lady", Alex and Justin accidentally turn Max into a little girl, Maxine, portrayed by Bailee Madison. She ends up making Alex jealous when their father prefers Maxine over Alex. Maxine remains until "Back to Max". In the episode "Everything's Rosie for Justin", Justin falls in love with Rosie, a guardian angel, but at the end of "Dancing with Angels" she becomes an Angel of Darkness. In "Zeke Finds Out", the Russos finally reveal to Zeke that they are wizards. In "Wizard of the Year", Alex is crowned Wizard of the Year for saving the world from the angels of darkness, and is reinstated in the Wizards Competition. In "Justin's Back In", Justin is reinstated in the Wizard Competition, after his class of delinquent wizards passes.

Meanwhile, Alex's relationship with Mason is jeopardized again when a beast tamer, Chase Riprock, falls in love with Alex and Mason gets jealous. This results in Alex breaking up with Mason. Alex, Justin and Max then save the world from being destroyed by an asteroid. Later, Alex and Harper move into an apartment building with a secret 13th floor for wizards and other creatures in the wizard world. However, it turns out to be a trap made by Gorog to capture the wizards who live in the same floor to make them join the dark side and rule the wizard world. He is defeated and destroyed by Alex, Justin and Max who were using the Power of Three. During this, Alex and Mason get back together and, after a long time, Justin finally gets back together with Juliet.

In the hour-long series finale, Alex, Justin, and Max compete in the family wizard competition. Alex wins and gains full wizardry; Justin becomes a full wizard as well when Professor Crumbs reveals he is retiring as headmaster of WizTech and passes the position to Justin. Jerry also decides to pass down the Waverly Sub Station to Max one day since he is the only child who is not a wizard anymore. The series ends with hugging and Alex saying that they are all happy.

Guest stars and recurring cast include: Gregg Sulkin as Mason Greybeck, Ian Abercrombie as Professor Crumbs, David Barrera as Carlos Cucuy, Samantha Boscarino as Lisa Cucuy, Bill Chott as Mr. Laritate, Frank Pacheco as Felix, Bridgit Mendler as Juliet van Heusen, Daniel Samonas as Dean Moriarty, Bailee Madison as Maxine Russo, Shane Harper as Fidel, Dan Benson as Zeke Beakerman, John Rubinstein as Gorog, Andy Kindler as Chancellor Tootietootie, Fred Stoller as Dexter, Leven Rambin as Rosie, China McClain as Tina, Kari Wahlgren as Helen, Cameron Sanders as Nelvis, Josh Sussman as Hugh Normous, Jackie Evancho as Herself, McKaley Miller as Talia, Valente Rodriguez as Muy Macho, and Nick Roux as Chase Riprock.

Cast 
 Selena Gomez as Alex Russo
 David Henrie as Justin Russo
 Jake T. Austin as Max Russo
 Jennifer Stone as Harper Finkle
 Maria Canals Barrera as Theresa Russo
 David DeLuise as Jerry Russo

Episodes

References

General references 
 
 
 

2010 American television seasons
2011 American television seasons
2012 American television seasons
Wizards of Waverly Place